Charles Peter Thrale Cantlay (born 4 February 1954) is an English businessman and former first-class cricketer.

Cantlay was educated at Radley College and Oriel College, Oxford. A fast bowler, he made his first-class debut for Oxford University in 1975, and took 4 for 85 and 4 for 102 in the first two innings of the season, but was less effective thereafter, and played in only six of Oxford's 14 first-class matches. Wisden said his bowling "had genuine pace" but "his direction at times was wayward". Scyld Berry thought his action was suspect. He also played in two List A matches for Combined Universities, taking 3 for 42 in the victory over Northamptonshire.
 
He joined Alexander Howden Reinsurance Brokers Ltd in 1976, and became managing director of the company's marine division in 1986 and chief executive officer in 1992. He joined AON Group Ltd in 1997, and became chairman of the marine and energy reinsurance division in 2000. He is a Liveryman of the Worshipful Company of Haberdashers.

References

External links
 Charles Cantlay at Cricinfo
 Charles Cantlay at CricketArchive

1954 births
Living people
People educated at Radley College
Alumni of Oriel College, Oxford
English cricketers
Oxford University cricketers
English businesspeople
British Universities cricketers
People from Victoria, London